Sailing at the 2010 Summer Youth Olympics in Singapore took place between 17 and 25 August. The sailing competition comprised four medal events with Boys and Girls sailing in either the Byte CII boat (one person dinghy) or Techno 293 (windsurfing).

One Person Dinghy

Boys

Girls

Windsurfing

Boys

Girls

Competition schedule

Results

Boys

Girls

References

 
2010 Summer Youth Olympics events
Youth Summer Olympics
2010
Sailing competitions in Singapore